Dimosthenis "Dimos" Dikoudis (alternate spellings include: Demosthenis, Demos, Ntikoudis) (born June 24, 1977 in Larissa, Greece), is a former Greek professional basketball player and basketball executive. He is 2.08 m (6 ft 10 in) tall, and he played as a power forward-center. Dikoudis was inducted into the Greek Basket League Hall of Fame in 2022.

Early years
Dikoudis started playing football at the age of 10, and later he was involved in Taekwondo. After two years of martial arts, he started playing basketball in his school team. With his school, he won the city championship, which was his first title, and right after that, he joined his first club, Perseas of Larissa. He played there until age 18, and he won four city and state championships there. With this club, he also won a national title, and was a member of the all state team.

Professional career
In 1995, Dikoudis signed his first contract with Olympia Larissas. He played there for three seasons, one in the semi-professional level Greek National B League, and two in the professional level Greek 2nd Division. He was the leading scorer and leading rebounder in the Greek 2nd Division in both seasons, and the MVP of the Greek 2nd Division in the last season. He was also a member of the Greek Under-21 national team at that time.

In 1998, he signed a contract with the top-tier level Greek League club AEK Athens, and he played there for five seasons. As a member of AEK, he won the FIBA Saporta Cup, the Greek League championship, and two Greek Cups. He was voted the Greek League Best Young Player for the 1999–00 season, and the Greek League MVP for the 2001–02 season.

In 2003, he decided to leave Greece, and he signed with the Spanish League club Valencia. He played there for a year, and after that, he moved to CSKA Moscow, where he won the Russian Championship and the Russian Cup (the first in the history of the club). With CSKA that season, he played at the Final Four of the EuroLeague, which was held at Moscow, and was won by Maccabi Tel Aviv, which featured another player from Larissa, Nestoras Kommatos (he was a co-player with Dikoudis in Perseas).

In 2005, he returned to Valencia, and he played in the finals of the Spanish Cup. In the summer of 2006, he returned to Greece, and signed with Panathinaikos. With Panathinaikos, he won the Triple Crown in the 2006–07 season.

In December 2008, he joined Panionios. After joining Panionios, he became one of only two Greek players in history, along with Ioannis Giannoulis, to compete in the EuroLeague with 4 different teams. In July 2009, he moved to Aris Thessaloniki. After seven years, he returned to AEK Athens. In September 2011, he signed a one-year deal with PAOK.

National team career 
With the senior Greek national team, Dikoudis made his debut on November 24, 1999, against the Estonian National Team. As a member of the Greek national team, he played at the 2001 EuroBasket at Turkey, the 2003 EuroBasket at Sweden, and at the 2004 Summer Olympic Games of Athens. On September 25, 2005, he won the gold medal at the 2005 EuroBasket, with the Greek national team.

On September 3, 2006, he won the silver medal at the 2006 FIBA World Championship. He played at the 2007 EuroBasket.

Managerial career
Dikoudis was appointed President of the Panhellenic Association of Paid Basketball Players (P.S.A.K.) in September 2006, with his term of office expiring in October 2010. Dikoudis became the Sports Director of the Greek League club AEK, in 2013. In 2021, he became the Administrative Manager of the senior Greek national team.

Career statistics

EuroLeague

|-
| style="text-align:left;"| 2000–01
| style="text-align:left;" rowspan=3| AEK
| 17 || 3 || 22.3 || .460 || .250 || .617 || 5.4 || .5 || .7 || .3 || 8.6 || 8.2
|-
| style="text-align:left;"| 2001–02
| 19 || 16 || 29.5 || .611 || .393 || .640 || 7.1 || .7 || .8 || .5 || 16.3 || 19.0
|-
| style="text-align:left;"| 2002–03
| 8 || 8 || 32.5 || .506 || .143 || .771 || 7.3 || .9 || .9 || .3 || 15.0 || 14.4
|-
| style="text-align:left;"| 2003–04
| style="text-align:left;"| Valencia
| 17 || 5 || 22.1 || .548 || .348 || .573 || 5.0 || .8 || .7 || .2 || 11.4 || 11.8
|-
| style="text-align:left;"| 2004–05
| style="text-align:left;"| CSKA Moscow
| 22 || 18 || 21.5 || .592 || .350 || .682 || 5.2 || 1.0 || 1.1 || .4 || 10.0 || 12.4
|-
| style="text-align:left;background:#AFE6BA;"| 2006–07†
| style="text-align:left;" rowspan=2| Panathinaikos
| 23 || 9 || 15.0 || .624 || .435  || .610 || 3.7 || .4 || .3 || .0 || 7.9 || 8.3
|-
| style="text-align:left;"| 2007–08
| 20 || 10 || 14.3 || .631 || .412 || .500 || 2.5 || .2 || .6 || .0 || 6.0 || 5.1
|-
| style="text-align:left;"| 2008–09
| style="text-align:left;"| Panionios
| 4 || 2 || 21.2 || .500 || .250 || .800 || 2.3 || .0 || .0 || .0 || 6.3 || 3.5
|- class="sortbottom"
| align="center" colspan="2"| Career
| 130 || 71 || ? || .566 || .362 || .629 || 4.8 || .6 || .7 || .2 || 10.1 || ?

Awards and accomplishments

Pro career
2× Eurobasket.com's Greek 2nd Division Player of the Year: (1997, 1998)
2× Greek 2nd Division Top Rebounder: (1997, 1998)
2× Greek 2nd Division Top Scorer: (1997, 1998)
Greek 2nd Division MVP: (1998)
Greek League Best Young Player: (2000)
4× Greek Cup Winner: (2000, 2001, 2007, 2008)
FIBA Saporta Cup Champion: (2000)
6× Greek League All-Star: (1999, 2001, 2002, 2003, 2007, 2008)
EuroLeague MVP of the Round: 2001–02 Regular season Round 7
3× Greek League Champion: (2002, 2007, 2008)
Greek League MVP: (2002)
Greek League Finals MVP: (2002)
Russian Cup Winner: (2005)
Russian Championship Champion: (2005)
EuroLeague Champion: (2007)
Triple Crown Winner: (2007)
Greek Basket League Hall of Fame: (2022)

Greece national team
5× Acropolis Tournament Champion: (2000, 2003, 2005, 2007, 2008)
2005 EuroBasket: 
2006 Stanković World Cup: 
2006 FIBA World Championship:

References

External links 
FIBA Profile
FIBA Europe Profile
Euroleague.net Profile
AEK.com Profile
Greek Basket League Profile 
Hellenic Basketball Federation Profile 
Spanish League Profile  
Spanish League Archive Profile 
Interbasket.net Greek Prospects
Eurobasket.com Profile

1977 births
Living people
2006 FIBA World Championship players
AEK B.C. players
Aris B.C. players
Basketball players at the 2004 Summer Olympics
Basketball players from Larissa
Centers (basketball)
FIBA EuroBasket-winning players
Greek basketball executives and administrators
Greek Basket League players
Greek expatriate basketball people in Spain
Greek men's basketball players
Liga ACB players
Olympia Larissa B.C. players
Olympic basketball players of Greece
Panathinaikos B.C. players
Panionios B.C. players
P.A.O.K. BC players
PBC CSKA Moscow players
Power forwards (basketball)
Valencia Basket players